Yamna, also known as Sunum, is an Austronesian language spoken on the coast and an island of Jayapura Bay in Papua province, Indonesia.

See also
Sarmi languages for a comparison with related languages

References

Languages of western New Guinea
Sarmi–Jayapura languages